Demetrice A. Martin (born February 28, 1973) is an American football coach who is currently the cornerbacks coach and passing game coordinator at the University of Oregon. He previously served as the cornerbacks coach at the University of Colorado Boulder from 2020 to 2021.

Martin played college football at Michigan State University as a wide receiver and cornerback from 1992 to 1995. Prior to his tenure at Oregon, he held various assistant coaching positions at Monrovia High School in Monrovia, California, John Muir High School in Pasadena, California, Pasadena City College, Mt. San Antonio College, the University of Southern California (USC), the University of Washington, University of California, Los Angeles (UCLA), University of Arizona and the University of Colorado Boulder.

Playing career

High school
Martin prepped at Muir High School in Pasadena, California and was drafted by the Atlanta Braves in baseball, but elected to play football.

College
Martin played college football at Michigan State University where he was a four-year letterman (1992–95). He began as a wide receiver, then switched to cornerback; he was all-conference in 1994.

Professional
Martin played on the practice squad of the St. Louis Rams in the National Football League (1996), in NFL Europe for the Scottish Claymores (1997) and the Arena Football League's Texas Terror (1998–99).

Coaching career

Early career
Martin began his coaching career as a high school coach in 1999 at Monrovia for two years and then at his alma mater Muir in 2001. He then coached at the junior college level for five years; two at Pasadena City College (2001–02) and three at Mt. San Antonio College (Mt. SAC) in Walnut (2003–05). He was a graduate secondary assistant coach at USC (2006–07),

Washington
In December 2008, Martin was hired as the cornerbacks coach at the University of Washington under head coach Steve Sarkisian.

UCLA
In December 2011, Martin joined the University of California, Los Angeles as their cornerbacks coach under head coach Jim Mora. He was let go after the 2017 season.

Arizona
Martin worked as the cornerbacks coach for Arizona in 2018 and 2019.

Colorado
Martin spent 2020 and 2021 as the cornerbacks coach for Colorado.

Oregon
It was announced that he would join Oregon for the 2022 as the team’s pass game coordinator and cornerbacks coach.

References

External links
Washington profile
USC profile
AFL stats
Accepts new position at Washington

1973 births
Living people
American football defensive backs
Arizona Wildcats football coaches
Colorado Buffaloes football coaches
Michigan State Spartans football players
Scottish Claymores players
Oregon Ducks football coaches
Texas Terror players
UCLA Bruins football coaches
USC Trojans football coaches
Washington Huskies football coaches
Players of American football from Pasadena, California
Sportspeople from Pasadena, California
African-American coaches of American football
African-American players of American football
21st-century African-American sportspeople
20th-century African-American sportspeople